Talakaveri or Talacauvery is the place that is generally considered to be the source of the river Kaveri and a holy place for many Hindus. It is located on Brahmagiri hills near Bhagamandala in Kodagu district, Karnataka State. It is located close to the border with Kasaragod district. Talakaveri stands at a height of 1,276 meters above sea level. However, there is not a permanent visible flow from this place to the main rivercourse except during the Monsoon.

A tank or  has been erected on a hillside, at the place that is said to be the origin. It is also marked by a small temple, and the area is frequented by pilgrims mainly it is the worship place of kodavas. The river originates as a spring feeding this tank, which is considered to be a holy place to bathe on special days. The waters are then said to flow underground to emerge as the Kaveri river some distance away.  The temple has been renovated extensively by the state government recently (2007).

On Cauvery Sankramana (colloquial  changrandi) day (the first day of Tula Masa month, according to the Hindu calendar, which normally falls in mid-October) thousands of pilgrims from neighboring flock to the river's birthplace to witness the rise of the fountainhead, when water gushes up from the spring at a predetermined moment. The cauvery changrandi (Sacred bath in the Tula month) is observed across pilgrim towns in Kaveri's banks.

Talakaveri is about 8 km away from Bhagamandala, 36 km from Panathur (Kerala) and 48 km from Madikeri.

Pilgrim center
The temple here is dedicated to Goddess Kaveramma.  Other deities worshipped here are Lord Agasthiswara, which denotes the link between Kaveri and Sage Agasthya.

The link between Kaveri and Lord Ganesha  extends to Srirangam, in Lord Ganesha's role in setting up the Ranganatha temple there.

The temple at Tirumakudalu Narasipura (confluence of Kabini, Kaveri and the legendary Spatika Sarovara)) is also dedicated to Agasthiwara.

History of the temple priests of Talakaveri 
It is believed that Mayura Varma, and Narasimman the Kadamba King who ruled vast areas of southern and central India in the 4th Century A.D. brought Brahmins from Ahi Kshetra (or Ahichatra) and put them in-charge of various temples in Tulu Nadu. Ahi Kshetra is mentioned in the Mahabharata as lying north of the Ganges, and as being the capital of Northern Panchala. It is apparently the Adisadra of Ptolemy, and its remains are visible near Ramnagar in Tahsil Aonla in Bareilly district.

The Brahmins who first landed in Shivalli in Tulunadu and then spread across 31 villages came to be known as Shivalli Brahmins or Tulu Brahmins. It is from Shivalli and Tulu Brahmins, that the priests of Talakaveri temple have come from.

Achar Family of Talakaveri 
The beginning of the Achar family in Talakaveri starts ten generations or about 220 to 240 years ago. A Brahmin named Venkappayya and his two brothers, along with their families came to Talakaveri on a pilgrimage. Lingaraja the First was the ruler of Kodagu from 1780 to 1790 AD. One night God appeared in Lingaraja's dream and indicated that there was a Brahmin family currently visiting Talakaveri. God commanded Lingaraja to appoint this Brahmin to be the priest at the temple. After the king arose from his dream, he sent for this Brahmin family. The king's messengers found Venkappayya in Talakaveri and informed him about the king's desire. Venkappayya accompanied the king's messengers from Talakaveri to Madikeri, a distance of about 24 miles to meet the king. 

Lingaraja received Venkappayya and requested him to start daily puja at the temple. The king set up an endowment to pay Venkappayya for his services at the temple. This was the beginning of the Achar family of Talacauvery. The priesthood bestowed by Lingaraja upon Venkappayya has passed on through many generations to his heirs. It is hereditary as most priesthoods are, and all male members of the family have the birthright to become priests at the temple. The current Achars are the ninth generation from Venkappayya.

Venkappayya came from Shivalli Halli (village) of South Canara district. The Brahmins here were called Putturayas, probably meaning priests from Puttur. This Puttur is near Udupi. Venkappayya Putturaya's descendants are the Achars. It is not known why the descendants of Venkappayya took on the surname of Achar. Although Venkappayya came to Talakaveri with his two brothers, only Venkappayya's descendants are documented.

Nearby
The Brahmagiri hill is situated right beside the temple. There are a series of steps leading to the top of the hill.

From there, one can have a 360 degree view of the surrounding hills.

Rainfall
It is situated in the dense forests of the Western Ghats and gets very heavy annual rainfall of close to 7000 mm and is among the wettest place in the state of Karnataka.

Comparisons
The table below compares rainfall  between Agumbe in Thirthahalli taluk in Shimoga district, Hulikal in Hosanagara taluk in Shimoga district, Amagaon in Khanapur Taluk in Belgaum district and Talacauvery in Madikeri taluk in Kodagu district, Kokalli of Sirsi Taluk, Nilkund of Siddapur Taluk, Castle Rock of Supa (Joida) Taluk in Uttara Kannada District to show which one can be called the "Cherrapunji of South India".

References

External links

Talakaveri
Talakaveri Tourism Guide

Villages in Kodagu district
Populated places in the Western Ghats
Tourist attractions in Karnataka
Hills of Karnataka
Hill stations in Karnataka
Kaveri River
Geography of Kodagu district
Tourist attractions in Kodagu district